The 2013–14 season was Aston Villa's 139th professional season; their 103rd season in the top-flight; and their 26th consecutive season in the top flight of English football, the Premier League. The club was managed by Paul Lambert, in his second season in charge.

Lambert's side began the season brightly, with a 3–1 win over Arsenal at Emirates Stadium on 17 August. Towards the end of 2013, the performances worsened greatly, especially home form, and Lambert was criticised by many fans and pundits for putting out a counter-attacking side with no plan B. Possession stats were biased towards the opposition in many games, including at home to Swansea; Villa had less than 30 percent of possession in a game which ended 1–1.

In the new year Villa lost 2–1 at home to Sheffield United, a team two divisions below them, marking the fourth consecutive year that Lambert has been eliminated from the FA Cup by lower league opposition. Lambert made headlines by claiming that "many Premier League clubs could do without the distraction of the FA Cup if they were being honest." He subsequently defended his comments, claiming they were "taken out of context."

Review

Pre-season 

The club announced its pre-season plans would begin with a tour of Germany. The tour took place between 10 and 14 July 2013 and saw Villa play three games against SV Rodinghausen,SC Paderborn and VfL Bochum, all which finished 1–1. The club then returned to England to play four more games against Wycombe Wanderers (finished 2–2), Luton Town(finished 2–0 to Luton), Crewe Alexandra (finished 5–1 to Villa) and Walsall (finished 5–0 to Villa). The penultimate pre-season game saw Villa travel to the Republic of Ireland for a match against Shamrock Rovers (finished 2–0 to Villa), before a match at Villa Park against Málaga (finished 3–2 to Villa), completed the schedule.

The Premier League fixtures were announced on 19 June, and Villa faced Arsenal at the Emirates Stadium in the first game of the season on 17 August. Coincidentally, this repeated the opening day fixture of the 2006–07 season. Villa then hosted Liverpool a week later in their first top flight home game of the season. The first West Midlands derby of the season, against West Bromwich Albion, was played at The Hawthorns on 23 November, with the return game at Villa Park taking place on 28 January 2014. Villa faced the first of the promoted clubs on 5 October, with a game against Hull City at the KC Stadium. Games against Cardiff City and Crystal Palace take place at Villa Park on 9 November and 26 December respectively.

Transfer summary 
On 7 June, Bulgarian winger Aleksandar Tonev agreed to join the club from Lech Poznań, with the fee rumoured at £2.5 million, to become their first signing of the summer. On 13 June, Villa continued recruiting players early as they signed both Jores Okore and Leandro Bacuna from Nordsjælland and Groningen respectively. Okore, a 20-year-old Danish international, stated"I want to bring something new to our game and really help the team into a new era.' He also acknowledged 'we have a good coach and this is a really good club. This is the right club for me, I feel it straight away." Upon his arrival, Bacuna said, "It's a new beginning for me, a new step and I'm looking forward to being part of this young, hungry team we have at Villa." Villa's fourth signing was confirmed five days later, as Nicklas Helenius signed a three-year deal and they then completed their fifth signing with left-back Antonio Luna sealing a move on20 June. On 26 June, the club announced they had agreed a deal with Norwich City to sign goalkeeper Jed Steer to serve as back-up to Brad Guzan. The 20-year-old will join on a free transfer on 1 July.

It was announced that Jean Makoun would be the first player to leave Villa in the summer, as Rennes made his loan move from the previous season permanent on 30 March 2013.The player officially left on 1 July. On 5 June, Richard Dunne, Eric Lichaj and Andy Marshall left the club after being released from the first-team as their contracts had expired.Four academy players: Callum Barrett, Daniel Devine, Josh Barton and Courtney Cameron were also released. Additionally, Simon Dawkins returned to Tottenham Hotspur after his loan had finished. On 22 June, the club confirmed that Brett Holman's contract had been terminated by mutual consent, freeing the player to join UAE team Al-Nasr. Young defenderDerrick Williams became the next player to leave the club, after he turned down a new deal with Villa to join Bristol City.

On 8 July, reports surfaced that Christian Benteke had handed in a transfer request at Villa. This was later confirmed by the club, who stated that he will be allowed to leave if a suitable offer is made "within an appropriate timeframe". Just 11 days later (19 July), Benteke made a U-turn and withdrew his transfer request, simultaneously signing a new four-year deal with club.On 8 August, after signing a new contract in the summer, 19-year-old forward Graham Burke joined Shrewsbury Town on loan until January 2014. Two days later (10 August), the last season's NextGen captain, Samir Carruthers, joined League One side Milton Keynes Dons on loan until January. On 16 August, record signing Darren Bent joined Fulham on an initial season-long loan. Nathan Delfouneso re-joined Blackpool on loan, until 1 January, on the same day.

On transfer deadline day Villa signed Czech forward Libor Kozák, the top scorer in the 2012–13 UEFA Europa League, from Lazio. He joined on a four-year deal for an undisclosed fee, rumoured to be between £5–7 million. Barry Bannan left the club, after nine years, to join Crystal Palace for an undisclosed fee and Stephen Ireland joined Stoke City on a season-long loan.

August 
The draw for the 2013–14 League Cup second round took place on 8 August. Villa faced Rotherham United of League One at Villa Park, on 28 August.

Villa began the season with a 1–3 away win over Arsenal at Emirates Stadium, becoming the first team to beat the Gunners on the opening day in 13 years. Olivier Giroud sent the hosts into an early lead, but a Christian Benteke double and a debut goal for Antonio Luna gave Villa the victory. Four days later, Villa faced Chelsea at Stamford Bridge in a rescheduled fixture. Chelsea won 2–1 but the match saw two controversial refereeing decisions go against Villa. The first involved Branislav Ivanović (who went on to score the winner in the 73rd minute) escaping a sending off for an elbow on Christian Benteke and the second a late penalty being denied, after the ball had hit John Terry on the arm. The first game of the season at Villa Park, and also the club's third game in seven days, was against Liverpool, where a first half Daniel Sturridge goal gave the away side a 0–1 win. On 28 August, Villa made it through to the League Cup third round after beating Rotherham United 3–0. The match was also the first time in 30 competitive outings that Villa had kept a clean sheet. Villa then drew Tottenham, played on 24 September.

August league table

August game stats

September 
Villa's first game after the international break ended up in a defeat to Newcastle United. Newcastle won the match 2–1, with goals from Hatem Ben Arfa and Yoan Gouffran cancelling outChristian Benteke's equaliser. It was later confirmed that defender Jores Okore had sustained a ruptured anterior cruciate ligament injury during the match, and would be out for up to nine months. The next match saw Paul Lambert win again at Carrow Road against former club Norwich City, as Villa ran out 1–0 winners. Libor Kozák got the winner, his first goal for the club, just seconds after replacing the injured Benteke. It also marked the first time in 26 league matches that Villa had kept a clean sheet. Three days later, it was confirmed that Benteke would be out for up to six weeks with a hip flexor injury. The day after the confirmation of Benteke's injury (26 September), Villa were eliminated from the League Cup after being beaten 0–4 by Tottenham. Villa had gone into the match with eight first team players out injured. However the result didn't dishearten the players, as the next match resulted in a 3–2 win against Manchester City. City had twice led through Yaya Touré and Edin Džeko but goals from Karim El Ahmadi, Leandro Bacuna and Andreas Weimann saw Villa earn their first points at home of the season.

September league table

September game stats

October 
An uneventful 0–0 draw at Hull City followed the Manchester City victory, as Villa recorded their first draw and second clean sheet of the season. After a two-week international break, Villa returned to league action against Tottenham Hotspur. The game finished 0–2 to Spurs, after goals from Andros Townsend and Roberto Soldado. Christian Benteke made his comeback from injury after coming on as a 61st-minute substitute. This defeat was followed by another, again at home, as Everton left Villa Park with three points courtesy of a 2–0 win. Benteke had a first half penalty saved by Tim Howard and Villa were made to rue this missed opportunity, as two second half goals from Romelu Lukaku and Leon Osman sealed an Everton victory.

October league table

October game stats

November 
A 0–0 draw against West Ham United extended Villa's winless, and goalless, run to four games. This run was eventually ended in the next match with a 2–0 victory over Cardiff City at Villa Park. Leandro Bacuna and Libor Kozák both scored their second goals for the club and Villa kept their first clean sheet at home for 17 games, as well as first back-to-back clean sheets since November 2012. Villa returned to action, after another international break, in the first West Midlands derby of the season against West Bromwich Albion. West Brom raced into a 2–0 lead within 11 minutes after two goals from Shane Long but Villa responded in the second half as Karim El Ahmadi pulled one back. Ashley Westwood then rescued a point for Villa with a goal from 25-yards out, his first for the club, as the match finished 2–2. Villa finished the month with a 0–0 draw against Sunderland at Villa Park.

November league table

November game stats

December 
Villa produced a great result in their first game of December, by beating Southampton 2–3 at St Mary's. Southampton twice equalised after Villa had led through Gabriel Agbonlahor's first goal of the season and then a Libor Kozák header. Fabian Delph grabbed the winner ten minutes from time with a 25-yard strike, his first ever Premier League goal. However four days later Villa suffered only their second away defeat of the season, after a disappointing performance in an eventual 2–0 defeat against Fulham. On the same day, Villa drew Sheffield United in the third round of the FA Cup. Manchester United were the visitors in the next game, and they left Villa Park with all three points after a 0–3 victory. A brace from Danny Welbeck and a third from Tom Cleverley gave the champions their first win in four games. Villa then slipped to a third consecutive defeat as they were beaten 2–1 by Stoke City at the Britannia Stadium. Charlie Adam and Peter Crouch scored either side of Libor Kozák's fourth of the season.
The traditional Boxing Day fixture saw Villa face Crystal Palace at Villa Park and resulted in a fourth straight defeat for the Claret and Blues. The match looked as though it would end in stalemate, however Eagles' substitute Dwight Gayle fired in a 92nd-minute winner. Villa eventually stopped the rot with a 1–1 draw against Swansea City, in their last game of 2013. Gabriel Agbonlahor gave Villa an early lead but Roland Lamah equalised for the Swans before half-time, as it finished all square.

December league table

December game stats

January 
Villa started the new year with victory over Sunderland at the Stadium of Light. Gabriel Agbonlahor scored the only goal, repeating the outcome of the match the season before. However, Villa were then knocked out of the FA Cup by a lower league team for a second consecutive season. This time it was Sheffield United who condemned Villa to defeat, after winning 2–1 at Villa Park. The defeat came days after it was revealed that striker Libor Kozák would miss the rest of the season after breaking his leg in training. The next match saw the same result for Villa, as Arsenal ran out 2–1 winners at Villa Park. Arsenal all but wrapped up the win before half time, after two goals in a minute from Jack Wilshere and Olivier Giroud. Christian Benteke ensured a nervy end for Arsenal, with his first goal since September, but they held on for all three points. Villa earned a point at Anfield next, despite leading Liverpool 2–0 at one point. The Merseysiders equalised through goals from Daniel Sturridge and a Steven Gerrard penalty, after Andreas Weimann and Christian Benteke had put Villa two goals to the good.Villa followed up their impressive performance against Liverpool, with a 4–3 win in a pulsating derby with West Bromwich Albion. Albion had gone 2–0 up in the first nine minutes but, just as atThe Hawthorns earlier in the season, Villa fought back to 2–2. Fabian Delph then put Villa into the lead with a wonder–strike, before Youssouf Mulumbu again drew the teams level before half-time. Christian Benteke then won and converted a penalty, his third goal in successive matches, which won it for Villa.

Transfer summary 
Villa made their first January signing on 14 January, when Grant Holt joined on loan from Wigan Athletic until the end of the season. Three days later Villa brought in a second player on loan, in left-back Ryan Bertrand from Chelsea.

Stephen Ireland left the club after three-and-a-half years, as his loan move to Stoke City was made permanent on 14 January. On 30 January, Nathan Delfouneso left the club on loan for the second time of the season, joining Coventry City.

January league table

January game stats

February 

Villa could not continue their good form into their next match, as they went down 1–2 at Everton. Leandro Bacuna had given Villa the lead but the Toffees emerged victorious after goals from Steven Naismith and Kevin Mirallas. Villa then proceeded to lose their eighth league match at home, after a 0–2 defeat to West Ham United, courtesy of two goals in two minutes from Kevin Nolan. Another disappointing result followed as despite a number of clear-cut goalscoring opportunities, Villa had to settle for a 0–0 draw at Cardiff City. Villa then lost their last game of February, 1–0 against Newcastle United, meaning they only acquired one point from a possible 12 in the month. This left Villa just four points off the relegation places, despite them lying in 13th place.

February league table

February game stats

March 
Villa somewhat made amends for their poor results in February, with a 4–1 home win against Norwich City in their first match of March. First half goals from Christian Benteke (2), Leandro Bacuna and an own goal from Sébastien Bassong gave Villa the victory, after Wes Hoolahan had given Norwich an early lead. Villa followed the victory with another, this time against league leaders Chelsea. Fabian Delph scored the only goal with a deft flick, in a match where Chelsea finished with nine men after having Willian and Ramires sent off, as well as manager José Mourinho being sent to the stands late on. The result also marked the first time in three-and-a-half years that Villa had won consecutive home games. However Villa's season-long inconsistency, especially at home, continued in their next match as they went down 1–4 to Stoke City. It looked as though Villa would continue where they left off in their last match, as Christian Benteke gave them the lead in the first five minutes. However three first half goals from Peter Odemwingie, Peter Crouch and Steven Nzonzi effectively ended the match as a contest, before Geoff Cameron ensured that Villa's home resurgence was abruptly ended. Villa lost by the same margin in their next match, this time against Manchester United. Ashley Westwood had scored a free-kick to give Villa an early lead but United had turned it around by half time, courtesy of two Wayne Rooney goals. In the second half, goals from Juan Mata and Javier Hernández condemned Villa to a consecutive 1–4 defeat.

March league table

March game stats

April 
On 3 April, news broke that Christian Benteke would be out for "a minimum of six months" with a ruptured Achilles tendon injury. The injury, that occurred in training, will rule the Belgian out of the rest of Villa's season as well as the 2014 FIFA World Cup. It didn't get any better for Villa as their next match again ended in defeat at home, this time to bottom club Fulham. The visitors took the lead before Grant Holt equalised with his first goal for the club, however Hugo Rodallega gave Fulham a survival lifeline with an 86th-minute winner. A further loss followed, this time against Crystal Palace. A Jason Puncheon strike gave Palace a 1–0 victory and saw Villa lose their fourth game in a row, resulting in them being just four points above the relegation zone. Villa's poor run culminated in the suspensions of assistant manager Ian Culverhouse and head of football operations Gary Karsa, pending an internal investigation. Development team coach Gordon Cowans and veteran goalkeeper Shay Given were both promoted to interim co-assistant manager as a result. Villa eventually stopped the rot, as well as putting a nightmare week behind them, with a 0–0 draw against Southampton at Villa Park. The next match, however, saw Villa slump to defeat yet again, this time 4–1 at Swansea, leaving them still in the thick of a fourth consecutive relegation battle.

April league table

April game stats

May
Villa eventually ended their six match winless run on the back of beating Hull City 3–1. This result saw the club all but guarantee their Premier League safety, due to their far superior goal difference over Norwich, the team occupying the remaining relegation place. Ashley Westwood scored after 56 seconds and Andreas Weimann got a brace before half time, after Jordan Bowery had put through his own net. However Villa ended a miserable season with a whimper, after two heavy defeats in four days. Villa travelled to the Etihad Stadium on 7 May for their rescheduled game versus Manchester City in their penultimate match of the season. The eventual champions thrashed Villa 4–0, after the visitors had held out for an hour. Edin Džeko scored a brace before goals from Stevan Jovetić and Yaya Touré effectively wrapped up the title for City, who needed just a point from their final game against West Ham (which they won 2–0) to win the league. The season was wrapped up with a 3–0 defeat against Tottenham, which saw Villa finish in 15th place for the second season running.

On 12 May 2014, chairman Randy Lerner released a statement confirming that the club was up for sale. In the statement, Lerner stated, "I have come to know well that fates are fickle in the business of English football. And I feel that I have pushed mine well past the limit." He also said that "the last several seasons have been week in, week out battles", and claimed that he "can see now that it is time, if possible, to hand these privileges and responsibilities to the next person or group to take the Club forward". This statement came after weeks of speculation about a possible decision to sell the club, after another statement from Lerner alluding to this at the end of April.

May league table

May game stats

Key events 

30 March 2013: Jean Makoun agrees a move to Rennes on a permanent basis; he will officially join on 1 July.
5 June: Richard Dunne, Eric Lichaj and Andy Marshall are released from the club.
7 June: Aleksandar Tonev agrees to join the club from Lech Poznań. Nathan Baker signs a new three-year deal with the club.
10 June: Andreas Weimann signs a new three-year contract with Villa until 2016.
13 June: Villa sign 20-year-old Danish defender Jores Okore from Nordsjælland, as well as Leandro Bacuna from Groningen. Also, Daniel Johnson signs a new two–year contract.
18 June: Nicklas Helenius joins Villa from Aalborg BK.
20 June: Villa make their fifth signing as Antonio Luna joins from Sevilla.
21 June: Charles N'Zogbia suffers an Achilles tendon injury, which was originally intended to see him out of action until around January. However, by March, N'Zogbia had still not returned to action and it was revealed that he was unlikely to return during the season.
22 June: Brett Holman's contract is terminated by mutual consent, with the player joining Al Nasr in the UAE.
24 June: Derrick Williams leaves the club and joins Bristol City.
26 June: Villa agree a deal with Norwich City for goalkeeper Jed Steer, with the player joining on a free transfer on 1 July.
1 July: Graham Burke, Samir Carruthers and Michael Drennan all sign new two-year deals.
6 July: Brad Guzan signs a new four-year deal until 2017.
8 July: Christian Benteke hands in a transfer request.
15 July: Ashley Westwood signs a new four-year contract with Villa, after impressing in his first season at the club.
18 July: Ciaran Clark becomes the next player to sign a new deal, agreeing a three-year contract with the club.
19 July: Christian Benteke withdraws his transfer request as well as signing a new four-year deal with the club. Matthew Lowton also agrees a new four-year deal until 2017.
8 August: Villa draw Rotherham United in the 2013–14 League Cup second round. Also, young forward Graham Burke joins Shrewsbury Town on loan until January.
10 August: Samir Carruthers joins Milton Keynes Dons on loan until January.
16 August: Darren Bent and Nathan Delfouneso both leave on loan, joining Fulham and Blackpool respectively.
17 August: Villa win their opening fixture 3–1 against Arsenal at the Emirates.
27 August: Third choice left-back Enda Stevens joins Notts County on a 28-day emergency loan.
28 August: Villa beat Rotherham United 3–0 in the League Cup second round. They draw Tottenham Hotspur in the third round.
2 September: On deadline day, Villa sign forward Libor Kozák and allow Barry Bannan and Stephen Ireland to leave on permanent and loan deals respectively.
16 September: Jores Okore is confirmed as out of action for up to nine months, after sustaining a ruptured anterior cruciate ligament injury in the game against Newcastle United.
24 September: Villa are knocked out of the League Cup after a 0–4 loss to Tottenham Hotspur. Top scorer Christian Benteke is ruled out for up to six weeks with a hip flexor injury.
28 September: Villa earn their first home points of the season, by beating Manchester City 3–2.
30 October: Winger Marc Albrighton joins Wigan Athletic on a 28-day loan.
9 November: Villa end a run of four games without winning, or scoring, with a 2–0 victory over Cardiff City. It is also their first home league clean sheet of the season.
28 November: Shay Given and Enda Stevens both leave on emergency loans to Middlesbrough and Doncaster Rovers respectively.
8 December: Villa draw Sheffield United in the third round of the FA Cup.
28 December: Villa end 2013 in 13th place in the Premier League after a 1–1 draw against Swansea City.
2 January 2014: Libor Kozák is ruled out for the rest of the season after breaking his leg.
4 January: Villa are knocked out of the FA Cup by Sheffield United.
14 January: Grant Holt joins the club on loan from Wigan until the end of the season. Stephen Ireland permanently joins Stoke City.
17 January: Ryan Bertrand joins on loan from Chelsea until the end of the season.
29 January: Villa come from 0–2 down to beat local rivals West Bromwich Albion 4–3 at Villa Park.
15 March: Villa beat Chelsea 1–0 at Villa Park, marking the first time they had won back-to-back at home since 2010.
3 April: Christian Benteke is ruled out of the rest of the season, as well as the 2014 FIFA World Cup, with a ruptured Achilles tendon injury. He will be out for a minimum of six months.
15 April: Assistant manager Ian Culverhouse and head of football operations Gary Karsa are suspended by the club, being replaced by Gordon Cowans and Shay Given as interim co-assistant managers.
3 May: Villa all but secure their Premier League status, due to a superior goal difference, after a 3–1 victory over Hull City.
11 May: Villa finish in 15th place for the second season running after a 3–0 defeat to Tottenham on the final day.
12 May: After weeks of speculation, Randy Lerner confirms that the club is up for sale.

Players

Squad information 
In the 2010–11 season, the Premier League introduced new rules on squad lists. The rules included a cap on the number of players at 25; players under the age of 21 on 1 January of the year in which the season starts are exempt from the list of 25. A "home-grown rule" also requires clubs to name at least eight players in their squad of 25 players that have been registered domestically for a minimum of three seasons prior to their 21st birthday.

Players under 21 do not need to be named and can still be used.
Squad subject to change during summer transfer window.

First team squad 

Source
Last updated on 12 May 2014.

Transfers

In 

Summer

Out 

Summer

Winter

Loans

In 

Winter

Out 

Summer

Winter

Squad number changes 

The #19 was retired for this season as a tribute to former captain Stiliyan Petrov.

Club

Current backroom staff 
.

Source: AVFC

Sponsorship 

The club's two–year contract with Genting Casinos ended in the summer, meaning Villa would have a new main sponsor for the season. On 11 June 2013, the club announced that the new sponsor would be the Asian online betting website Dafabet and that the company's name would be featured on the new club's new kits.

Playing staff & managerial kits will again be provided by Italian sportswear manufacturer Macron.

Senior team

Overall

Fixtures and results

Pre-season

Tour of Germany 

On 17 May 2013, the club announced it would be taking part in a pre-season tour of Germany as part of the preparations for the 2013–14 season. The tour saw Villa taking on three clubs in games between 10 and 14 July 2013 with each finishing in a 1–1 draw. Nicklas Helenius scored his first two goals for the club, in the matches against SV Rödinghausen and VfL Bochum and Andreas Weimann scored against SC Paderborn.

Domestic friendlies

Premier League

League table

Results by matchday

Matches

August

September

October

November

December

January

February

March

April

May

FA Cup

League Cup

Statistics

League results summary

Overall 

1 "Best result" is defined by goal difference between the two teams. How many goals Villa score and whether they keep a clean sheet affects which result is listed (when goal difference is the same e.g. 1–0 or 2–1).  2 "Worst result" is defined by goal difference between the two teams. How many goals Villa concede and how many they score affects which result is listed (when goal difference is the same e.g. 0–1 or 1–2).

Appearances 

Notes

Includes Cup competitions as well (League Cup & FA Cup).

Captains

Goalscorers 

Correct as of 11 May 2014
Players with the same number of goals are listed by their position on the club's official website Source
  Players highlighted in light grey denote the player had scored for the club before leaving for another club
  Players highlighted in light cyan denote the player has scored for the club after arriving at Aston Villa during the season
  Players highlighted in Blonde denote the player has scored for the club before leaving the club on loan for part/the rest of the season

Disciplinary record 

Correct as of 11 May 2014 
Players are listed in descending order of 
Players with the same number of cards are listed by their position on the club's official website Source
  Players highlighted in light grey denote the player has received a yellow/red card for the club before leaving for another club
  Players highlighted in light cyan denote the player has received a yellow/red card for the club after arriving at Aston Villa during the season
  Players highlighted in Blonde denote the player has received a yellow/red card for the club before leaving the club on loan for part/the rest of the season

Notes

Suspensions

Clean sheets 

Includes all competitive matches.

Penalties awarded 

Includes all competitive matches.

Injuries 

Players in bold are still out from their injuries.  Players listed will/have miss(ed) at least one competitive game (missing from whole match day squad).

Home attendances 

Correct as 3 May 2014

References

Aston Villa
Aston Villa F.C. seasons